Nimnica is a spa village and municipality in Púchov District in the Trenčín Region of north-western Slovakia. It is located between the towns of Púchov and Považská Bystrica.

History
In historical records the village was first mentioned in 1408.

Geography
The municipality lies at an altitude of 269 metres and covers an area of 7.356 km². It has a population of about 670 people.

Culture
It is mostly known for its spa, which opened in 1959, following a discovery of a strong spring during the construction of a local dam.

References

External links
 
 

Villages and municipalities in Púchov District